Hat, Coat and Glove is a 1934 American pre-Code crime drama film directed by Worthington Miner from a screenplay by Francis Faragoh.  It starred Ricardo Cortez, Barbara Robbins, and John Beal.

Plot

Cast
 Ricardo Cortez as Robert Mitchell
 Barbara Robbins as Dorothea Mitchell
 John Beal as Jerry Hutchins
 Dorothy Burgess as Ann Brewster
 Paul Harvey as The Prosecuting Attorney
 Sara Hadenas The Secretary
 Margaret Hamilton as Madame Du Barry
 David Durand as Thomas Sullivan
 Murray Kinnell as The Judge
 Fred Sullivan as The Court Clerk
 Gayle Evers as The Saleslady

References

External links 
 

1934 crime drama films
1934 films
American black-and-white films
American crime drama films
1930s American films
Films with screenplays by Francis Edward Faragoh
1930s English-language films